Typhoon Zeke, known in the Philippines as Typhoon Etang, was the first of two typhoons to make landfall in China within a week during mid-July 1991. An area of disturbed weather developed east of the Philippines towards the end of the first week of July. Tracking west-northwestward, the disturbance organized into a tropical depression on July 9. After tracking across the Philippines, where it left two people missing and injured three others, the depression intensified into a tropical storm on July 10. The storm steadily deepened as it moved across the South China Sea, and on July 12 it strengthened into a typhoon. The system tracked across Vietnam on July 13, and dissipated within two days after moving inland.

Across Hainan, 30 people were killed and 77 others were injured. Nearly 3,700 homes were destroyed and over 58,000 others were damaged. Around 900,000 ha (2,200,000 acres) of farmland was flooded. Eighty-three ships sunk and thirty-eight bridges collapsed. Overall, damage in the province was estimated at ¥5.1 billion (US$956 million). In the province of Guangxi, at least one person was killed and another injured, while over 180 houses were destroyed and 5,000 others damaged. Offshore Fangchenggang, two people died and seven went missing after a ship sunk. Elsewhere, in the province of Guangdong, four people were reported missing and 1,170 homes were destroyed. Nationwide, 33 people were killed and 11 others were listed as missing.

Meteorological history

Typhoon Zeke developed from a tropical disturbance in the Western Pacific monsoon trough southwest of Guam. Increased convection associated with the disturbance was first monitored by the Joint Typhoon Warning Center (JTWC) at 06:00 UTC on July 6, 1991. Following evidence that the disturbance had developed a low pressure center, the JTWC issued a Tropical Cyclone Formation Alert early on July 9. Two hours later, the Japan Meteorological Agency (JMA) upgraded the system into a tropical depression. After a steady increase in deep convection near the center of the system, the JTWC declared it a tropical depression at noon on July 9.

The depression tracked across the Luzon as it accelerated to the northwest in response to a surge in the southwesterly monsoonal flow over the South China Sea and emerged into the South China Sea on July 10, when it was upgraded into a tropical storm by the JTWC and JMA, with the former naming it Zeke. Despite the Navy Global Environmental Model and in turn the JTWC calling for recurvature, Zeke reverted to a largely westward track. On the morning of July 11, Zeke was upgraded into a severe tropical storm by the JMA. Twenty-four hours later, the JTWC declared the cyclone a typhoon. Zeke weakened slightly after crossing the island, with the JMA downgrading the system into a severe tropical storm on the morning of July 13. Weakening accelerated as it moved inland, and by midday on July 14, the JTWC had ceased tracking the storm. The JMA followed suit early the next day.

Impact

During its formative stages, the depression left two people reported as missing and injured three people across the Philippines. Zeke was responsible for heavy damage across Hainan, the most southern province in China. Power was knocked out in five counties in the province. According to press reports, 30 people were killed there and 77 others were injured. Close to 3,700 houses collapsed, and 58,103 others were damaged. Eighty-three vessels sank. Monetary damage in the province was estimated at ¥5.1 billion (US$956 million).

In the province of Guangxi, at least one person was killed and another was injured. There, over 180 houses were destroyed and 5,000 others were damaged. About  of paddy field were damaged. Offshore Fangchenggang, two people died, seven were missing, and nineteen survived after a Vietnamese cargo vessel sank. In western Guangdong, where 1,170 houses collapsed and 11,700 others were damaged, four people went missing. Damage was estimated at about ¥19.4 million (US$3.63 million). Zeke was the first of two typhoons to hit China in a week, the second being Typhoon Amy.

As winds across Hong Kong continued to increase and Zeke made its closest approach to the area, a No. 3 signal was issued. All signals were dropped by the end of the day as the threat subsided.

See also

Typhoon Hal (1985)

Notes

References

1991 Pacific typhoon season
Typhoons in the Philippines
Typhoons in China
1991 in China
Typhoons in Hong Kong